Pavel Gennadyevich Kamentsev; born 15 August 1969) is a  Kazakhstani retired ice hockey player. During his career he played for several teams in both Russia and Kazakhstan. Kementsev also played for the Kazakhstani national team at the 1998 Winter Olympic Games and multiple World Championships.

Career statistics

Regular season and playoffs

International

References

External links

1969 births
Living people
Avangard Omsk players
HC MVD players
HC Sibir Novosibirsk players
Ice hockey players at the 1998 Winter Olympics
Kazakhstani ice hockey centres
Soviet ice hockey centres
Kazzinc-Torpedo players
Olympic ice hockey players of Kazakhstan
Sportspeople from Oskemen